Lottery is a 2007 novel by Patricia Wood. Her first published novel, it was shortlisted for the 2008 Orange Prize for Fiction.

Writing and publication
Wood drew on personal experience: her father won $6 million from the Washington state lottery, and her brother-in-law had Down syndrome. Wood wrote the novel in 3 months, and sold it for a reported six-figure deal.

Plot
The novel focuses on Perry Crandall, a man with an IQ of 76, who wins $12 million in a lottery.

Critical reaction
New York Magazine compared it favorably to Forrest Gump, calling it "heartfelt and totally not corny". The Independent gave it a positive review, noting that it wouldn't be to all tastes and sometimes the central character seemed a bit too wise, but found it offered a pleasing story of an underdog's triumph. Blogcritics found it "poignant" and praised the believable depiction of its central character.

The Guardian noted other critics' comparisons to The Curious Incident of the Dog in the Night-time but found it simple-minded with the simplistic morality of pantomime.

References

2007 American novels
Works about lotteries
Heinemann (publisher) books
Novels set in the United States
2007 debut novels